Nele Alder-Baerens (born 1 April 1978) is a German female distance runner and marathon runner. She is regarded as one of the finest long-distance runners from Germany to have represented the nation at the Deaflympics. Nele Alder-Baerens has represented Germany at the Deaflympics in 1997, 2001, 2005, 2017 and in 2022 has clinched 5 medals in her Deaflympic career including 2 gold medals. She is also the defending champion in the women's marathon at the Deaflympics. Nele also currently holds few deaf world records in the women's Athletics.

Biography 
Nele Alder-Baerens was born on the 1st of April, 1978 in Berlin. She is very short sighted with twelve dioptres due to early birth and deaf. Despite her disability with both blindness and deafness, she took the sport of Athletics and also competed in the German National Athletics Championships. In 2000, she was awarded the Junior Deaf Sportswoman of the Year award. She graduated from the  Margarathe von Witzleben School which is located in Berlin.

Career 
Nele made her Deaflympic debut at the  1997 Summer Deaflympics and couldn't win any medal in the competition. She claimed her first medal at the Deaflympics in 2001, where she won the silver medal in the women's 800 m individual event. Nele continued her medal hunt at the 2005 Summer Deaflympics by claiming gold medal in the women's 5000 m event and bronze medal in the women's 10000 m event. In the 2017 Summer Deaflympics, she clinched her first Deaflympic medal for marathon event after winning the gold medal in the women's marathon event. In 2016, despite her disability she participated in the women's IAU 50 km World Championships and secured silver medal in the event which was held in Doha.

Nele was awarded the ICSD Deaf Sportswoman of the Year award in 2016 by the Comite International des Sports des Sourds. She was also nominated for the ICSD Deaf Sportswoman of the Year award in 2005.

Nele Alder-Baerens also holds the world record in the Ultra marathon 6H Road event with a record of 85.492 km distance.
In 2019 at the 24-hour World Championship in Albi, France, Nele ran 254.288 km (158 miles) for a silver medal overall in the female competition for farthest distance covered in 24 hours. She was ahead of the next competitor by a little over 4 miles.

She took part at the 2021 Summer Deaflympics which also marked her fifth appearance at the competition since her debut in 1997. She fell short of a bronze medal finish to Kenya's Grancy Kandogar in the women's 10000 m race final after finishing at fourth place clocking 40:34.62 seconds.

References

External links 
 
 Profile at Deaflympics
 Profile at All Athletics.com
 Profile at getresultperson.php
 Profile at arrs.run

1978 births
Living people
Athletes from Berlin
German female middle-distance runners
German female long-distance runners
German female marathon runners
Deaf competitors in athletics
German deaf people
Athletes (track and field) at the 1997 Summer Deaflympics
Athletes (track and field) at the 2001 Summer Deaflympics
Athletes (track and field) at the 2005 Summer Deaflympics
Athletes (track and field) at the 2017 Summer Deaflympics
Athletes (track and field) at the 2021 Summer Deaflympics
Medalists at the 2001 Summer Deaflympics
Medalists at the 2005 Summer Deaflympics
Medalists at the 2017 Summer Deaflympics
Deaflympic gold medalists for Germany
Deaflympic silver medalists for Germany
Deaflympic bronze medalists for Germany
German national athletics champions
20th-century German women
21st-century German women